Siberian tomato is a type of the common tomato plant (Solanum lycopersicum).

Summary 
In 1984, William Bonsall introduced the seed for this variety of tomato to the Seed Savers Exchange Yearbook. When the tomato was first domesticated is unknown. However, it was known to grow in Southern Mexico in 500 BC. This variety grows well in most parts of North America.

This type of tomato is very robust and versatile, which makes it best  for canning or processing. They are of the heirloom variety of tomato.

References 

Tomato cultivars